The Summer Guest is a 1992 Hungarian drama film directed by Can Togay. It was screened in the Un Certain Regard section at the 1992 Cannes Film Festival.

Cast
 Géza Balkay - A nyaraló
 Mari Törőcsik - A nyaraló anyja
 Marta Klubowicz - Fiatal nő
 Adél Kováts - Fiatal nő (voice)
 Juli Básti - Kocsmárosnő
 József Madaras - A kocsmárosnő férje
 Miklós Székely B. - Rendőr
 Gábor Reviczky - Sofőr
 Gábor Ferenczi
 Endre Kátay
 László Csurka
 Károly György
 János Ács
 Csaba Magyar
 Árpád Babay
 Alexandra Nagy

References

External links

1992 films
1990s Hungarian-language films
1992 drama films
Films directed by Can Togay
Hungarian drama films